The 2005 Polish Figure Skating Championships were held in Opole between December 17 and 19, 2004.

A new system of judging was implemented that year for the senior and junior categories (apart from junior synchronized teams).

Senior results

Men

Judges were:
 Referee: Hanna Then
 Technical Controller: Ewa Lachowicz
 Technical Specialist:Anna Sierocka
 Judge No. 1: Ryszard Kiewrel
 Judge No. 2: Agata Wasilewska
 Judge No. 3: Beata Dombkowska
 Judge No. 4: Małgorzata Sobków
 Judge No. 5: Danuta Dubrówko

Ladies

Judges were:
 Referee: Aniela Hebel-Szmak
 Technical Controller: Halina Gordon-Półtorak
 Technical Specialist: Magdalena Seredyńska
 Judge No. 1: Olga Pałasz
 Judge No. 2: Beata Dombkowska
 Judge No. 3: Katarzyna Olesińska
 Judge No. 4: Adrianna Lachowicz
 Judge No. 5: Anastasia Papagiannapoulou

Pairs

Judges were:
 Referee: Aniela Hebel-Szmak
 Technical Controller: Ryszard Kiewrel
 Technical Specialist: Anna Sierocka
 Judge No. 1: Hanna Then
 Judge No. 2: Magdalena Seredyńska
 Judge No. 3: Małgorzata Sobków
 Judge No. 4: Danuta Dubrówko
 Judge No. 5: Jan Wikłacz

Ice dancing

Judges were:
 Referee: Malgorzata Sobków
 Technical Controller: Halina Gordon-Półtorak
 Technical Specialist: Sylwia Nowak-Trębacka
 Judge No. 1: Danuta Dubrówko
 Judge No. 2: Marcin Kozubek
 Judge No. 3: Marcin Czajka
 Judge No. 4: Tomasz Politański
 Judge No. 5: Małgorzata Grajcar

Junior results

Men

Judges were:
 Referee: Hanna Then
 Technical Controller: Ryszard Kiewrel
 Technical Specialist: Anna Sierocka
 Judge No. 1: Andżelika Rzeczkowska-Drab
 Judge No. 2: Olga Pałasz
 Judge No. 3: Adrianna Lachowicz
 Judge No. 4: Jan Wikłacz
 Judge No. 5: Katerina Kondaki

Ladies

Judges were:
 Referee: Aniela Hebel-Szmak
 Technical Controller: Anna Sierocka
 Technical Specialist: Magdalena Seredyńska
 Judge No. 1: Andżelika Rzeczkowska-Drab
 Judge No. 2: Joanna Szczerba
 Judge No. 3: Agata Wasilewska
 Judge No. 4: Katarzyna Olesińska
 Judge No. 5: Slobodan Delic

Ice dancing

Judges were:
 Referee: Danuta Dubrówko
 Technical Controller: Halina Gordon-Półtorak
 Technical Specialist: Małgorzata Sobków
 Judge No. 1: Andrzej Józefowicz
 Judge No. 2: Marcin Kozubek
 Judge No. 3: Marcin Czajka
 Judge No. 4: Tomasz Politański
 Judge No. 5: Małgorzata Grajcar

Synchronized

Judges were:
 Referee: Joanna Szczerba
 Judge No. 1: Marcin czajka
 Judge No. 2: Magdalena Seredyńska
 Judge No. 3: Marcin Kozubek

Novice results

Men

Judges were:
 Referee: Jan Wikłacz
 Assistant Referee: Danuta Dubrówko
 Judge No. 1: Andżelika Rzeczkowska-Drab
 Judge No. 2: Joanna Szczerba
 Judge No. 3: Beata Dombkowska
 Judge No. 4: Andrzej Józefowicz
 Judge No. 5: Joanna Pogrzeba

Ladies

Judges were:
 Referee: Jan Wikłacz
 Assistant Referee: Andrzej Józefowicz
 Judge No. 1: Ryszard Kiewrel
 Judge No. 2: Olga Pałasz
 Judge No. 3: Agata Wasilewska
 Judge No. 4: Adrianna Lachowicz
 Judge No. 5: Joanna Pogrzeba

Pairs

Judges were:
 Referee: Jan Wikłacz
 Assistant Referee: Danuta Dubrówko
 Judge No. 1: Andżelika Rzeczkowska-Drab
 Judge No. 2: Joanna Szczerba
 Judge No. 3: Beata Dombkowska
 Judge No. 4: Andrzej Józefowicz
 Judge No. 5: Joanna Pogrzeba

External links
 2005 Polish Championships results at the Polish Figure Skating Association

Polish Figure Skating Championships
2004 in figure skating
2004 in Polish sport